Iringaprom is a census town in Thrissur district in the Indian state of Kerala.

Demographics
 India census, Iringaprom had a population of 8535. Males constitute 47% of the population and females 53%. Iringaprom has an average literacy rate of 84%, higher than the national average of 59.5%: male literacy is 85%, and female literacy is 83%. In Iringaprom, 12% of the population is under 6 years of age.

References

Cities and towns in Thrissur district